Footlight Glamour is a 1943 black-and-white film and the 14th of the 28 Blondie films. It is one of only two movies in the series that did not feature "Blondie" in the title (the other, It's a Great Life, was released earlier that year). It was the last film in the "Blondie" series for:
 Frank R. Strayer as producer/director, and
 Irving Bacon as the Bumsteads' hapless mailman, who would be replaced by Eddie Acuff.

Plot summary

Dagwood is hired to work at a new tool manufacturering plant, but things become unusual when Blondie casts the daughter of the rich owner of the plant in a play.

Cast
 Penny Singleton as Blondie
 Arthur Lake as Dagwood
 Larry Simms as Baby Dumpling
 Ann Savage as Vicki Wheeler
 Jonathan Hale as J.C. Dithers
 Irving Bacon as Mr. Crum
 Marjorie Ann Mutchie as Cookie
 Danny Mummert as Alvin Fuddle
 Daisy as Daisy the Dog

References

External links
 
 
 
 

1943 films
Columbia Pictures films
American black-and-white films
Blondie (film series) films
1943 comedy films
Films directed by Frank R. Strayer
American comedy films
1940s American films